Dyothelitism or dithelitism (from Greek δυοθελητισμός "doctrine of two wills") is a particular Christological doctrine that teaches the existence of two wills (divine and human) in the person of Jesus Christ. Specifically, dyothelitism correlates the distinctiveness of two wills with the existence of two specific natures (divine and human) in the person of Jesus Christ (dyophysitism).

History 
The Catechism of the Catholic Church, no. 475, states:

This position is in opposition to the Monothelitism position in the Christological debates. The debate concerning the Monothelite churches and the Dithelite churches came to a conclusion at the Third Council of Constantinople in 681. The Council declared that in line with the declarations of the Council of Chalcedon in 451, which declared two natures in the one person of Jesus Christ, there are equally two "wills" or "modes of operation" in the one person of Jesus Christ as well.

Dyothelitism was championed by Maximus the Confessor against monothelitism, the doctrine of one will.

See also 
 Monothelitism
 Dyoenergism

References

Sources 
 
 Andrew Loke, "On Dyothelitism Versus Monothelitism: The Divine Preconscious Model", The Heythrop Journal, vol. 57/1 (2016) 135–141.

External links 
 Classical Christianity (2016): St. Cyril on Dyoenergism and Dyotheletism
 History of the Christian Church, Volume IV: Mediaeval Christianity. A.D. 590-1073

Christology
Christian terminology
Eastern Orthodox theology
Christianity in the Byzantine Empire
7th-century Christianity
Nature of Jesus Christ